Triboldingerbohl, also known as Triboltingen or großes Bohl or Langenrain, is the fourth largest island of Lake Constance, with an area of . It is located in the easternmost part of the Untersee (Lake Constance), near the point where the Seerhein flows into the lake. This part of the lake is also known as the Rheinsee. It belongs to the Wollmatinger Ried nature conservation area; administratively it belongs to the district industrial area of the City of Constance. Until 1934, it belonged to the municipality of Wollmatingen, which was then annexed by Constance. The area between Triboldingerbohl island and the Reichenau dam is called Ermatinger pool and is an ecologically important shallow-water zone.

Triboldingerbohl is uninhabited. It is a bird sanctuary. It takes its name from the former Swiss municipality Triboltingen, which was located on the southern shore of Lake Untersee. Between Triboldingerbohl and the mainland lies the smaller island of Mittler Bohl, also known as Langbohl.

Both island are covered with reeds.  They consist of a several meters thick layer of Schnegglisand, a calcareous deposits from Blue-green algae), which is covered by a layer of humus.

Although the island is uninhabited, it is listed in the Constance street directory.  It falls under postal code 78467 (Constance-Wollmatingen).

Footnotes

Uninhabited islands of Germany
Islands of Lake Constance in Germany
Landforms of Baden-Württemberg